Agneta Lindskog (born April 25, 1953) is a Swedish luger who competed during the late 1970s and early 1980s. She won the silver medal in the women's singles event at the 1976 FIL European Luge Championships in Hammarstrand, Sweden.

Lindskog also finished 13th in the women's singles event at the 1980 Winter Olympics in Lake Placid, New York.

References

External links
1980 Winter Olympic results in women's singles luge.
List of European luge champions 

1953 births
Living people
Sportspeople from Stockholm
Lugers at the 1976 Winter Olympics
Lugers at the 1980 Winter Olympics
Swedish female lugers
Olympic lugers of Sweden
20th-century Swedish women